Juan Romagoza Arze (born 1960) is a Salvadoran surgeon, and current director of La Clinica del Pueblo.

Early years
Romagoza was born in Usulutan, El Salvador. In 1973 enrolled to medicine school in University of El Salvador. During his surgeon rotation practice worked in poor and rural areas and was witness of violence and repression by government forces during Salvadoran Civil War against poor, church workers and medical personal that aid them.

Kidnapping and torture
In December 1980, while Romagoza was providing medical care at a church clinic in Santa Anita, Chalatenango, two army vehicles arrived to the clinic and opened fire to the people, Romagoza was shot in one foot and kidnapped and jailed at National Guard headquarters in San Salvador for 22 days where he was tortured and interrogated three or four times per day by electric shocks, cigarette burns, sexually assault, water torture, and being hung by his fingers. In one torturer session he was in his left hand in presence of Vides Casanova. Juan was released in January 1981 due to the detention he lost 80 pounds and lost his ability to perform surgery due to the injuries inflicted and had to be physically carried out by his uncle.

United States 
Juan Romagoza fled El Salvador and  moved to Guatemala, Mexico, and lately to the United States in April 1983 was to become an American Citizen in 1986 and was granted political asylum in 1987.

Central American Refugee Center 
Ramagoza became active in assisting the refugee communities and co-founded the Central American Refugee Center (CRECE).

La Clínica del Pueblo 
Romagoza worked at La Clínica del Pueblo, were became executive director in 1987 and this was a second opportunity to Romagoza to serve free medical care to poor or low income people.

Ramagoza v. Garcia 

Ramagoza v. Garcia was a lawsuit filed by the Center for Justice and Accountability on behalf of survivors of torture during the Salvadoran Civil War. General Garcia lost, and a judgment of over $54 million (U.S.) was entered against him and his co-defendant, and upheld on appeal.

Clinic El Espino 
In 2008, Juan returned to El Salvador and founded the Clinic El Espino, Usulutan, El Salvador, were provide free medical treatment to the communities where he began his career.

References

External links
 La Clinica del Pueblo website

1960 births
American health care businesspeople
American surgeons
Living people
Medical educators
Salvadoran surgeons
Salvadoran emigrants to the United States